Tevita Pangai Junior (born 4 February 1996) is a Tonga international rugby league footballer who plays as a  and  for the Canterbury-Bankstown Bulldogs in the NRL.

He previously played for the Brisbane Broncos and Penrith Panthers with whom was part of the 2021 NRL Grand Final winning squad but did not play

Background
Pangai was born in Ashfield, New South Wales, Australia, is of, Niuean, Tuvaluan and Tongan descent, and moved to Newcastle, New South Wales at a young age.

He played his junior rugby league for the South Newcastle Lions in the Newcastle Rugby League, before being signed by the Newcastle Knights.

Pangai is the younger brother of former North Queensland Cowboys player Mosese Pangai.

Playing career

Early career
After playing in the lower grades at the Newcastle Knights, Pangai Junior joined the Canberra Raiders in 2013 and played for their NYC team from 2013 to 2015. On 7 November 2013, he re-signed with Canberra on a three-year contract. 

On 18 October 2014, he played for the Junior Kangaroos against the Junior Kiwis, playing at second-row in the Kangaroos' 14–15 loss at Mt Smart Stadium. He was again selected for the Junior Kangaroos in May 2015, playing off the interchange bench in the Kangaroos' 22-20 win at Robina Stadium. On 12 September 2015, he was named in Tonga's 58-man train-on squad for the World Cup qualifier against the Cook Islands. Two days later, he was named at second-row in the 2015 NYC Team of the Year.

2016
In January, Pangai Junior signed a two-year contract with the Brisbane Broncos starting in 2017, however, in February, he was granted a release from the final year of his Canberra contract to join Brisbane effective immediately on a revised contract for just the 2016 NRL season. On 7 May, he played for the Junior Kangaroos against the Junior Kiwis for a third year in a row, starting at prop and captaining the side in the Kangaroos' 34-20 win at Parramatta Stadium. In Round 12 of the 2016 NRL season, he made his NRL debut for the Brisbane against the Wests Tigers, playing off the interchange bench in Brisbane's 19-18 loss at Suncorp Stadium. In his next match in Round 13 against the New Zealand Warriors, he scored his first NRL career try in Brisbane's 36-18 loss at Mt Smart Stadium. He finished his debut year in the NRL having played in 14 matches and scoring 2 tries for the Broncos in the 2016 NRL season. On 22 September, he re-signed with Brisbane on a two-year contract until the end of 2018.

2017
After the Broncos' local derby clash against the Gold Coast in Round 7 which they won with a 24-22 win at Suncorp Stadium, Pangai Junior suffered a finger injury during the match and was sidelined for a number of weeks. Pangai Junior would return from injury in Round 13 against the Sydney Roosters in the 18-16 loss at Sydney Football Stadium. Pangai Junior finished the 2017 NRL season with him playing in 18 matches for the Broncos. On 5 October 2017, Pangai Junior was selected in the 24-man squad for Tonga for the 2017 Rugby League World Cup. On 11 November 2017, Pangai Junior made his international debut for Tonga against New Zealand, coming off the interchange bench in the inspirational 28-22 shock win at Waikato Stadium. Pangai Junior would play in the next match for Tonga against Lebanon in their 24-22 win at AMI Stadium in Christchurch. In Tonga’s Semi Final match against England, Pangai Junior scored his first international try, the start of an unlikely Tonga comeback from 20-0 down with 9 minutes to fulltime. As Tonga would dare to dream and score another two more 2 tries to make the score 20-18 with 2 minutes to fulltime, England winger Jermaine McGillvary lost the ball in his own half of the field, Tonga had one more final chance to pinch a stunning victory but unfortunately would end up in tears after Andrew Fifita would go over the tryline on the fulltime siren but the try wasn’t checked by the video referee when the ball was raked out of his hand by England second-rower Elliot Whitehead but was seen by referee Matt Cecchin as a knock on, the match ending in a thrilling fashion 20-18 at Mt Smart Stadium. Pangai Junior finished the exciting tournament with him playing in 3 matches and scoring 1 try.

2018
After showing a good performance in Round 1 against the St. George Illawarra Dragons as Brisbane lost 34–12 at Kogarah Oval. In Round 2 in the Queensland derby match against the North Queensland Cowboys, Pangai Junior had a monster performance, scoring a try out of sheer strength, nearly scoring a second identical try but was disallowed and making a very crucial try saving tackle on North Queensland forward Scott Bolton as he ran to score under the posts from a inside ball from Johnathan Thurston but was slammed into the goalpost by him in the 78th minute and the Broncos came on top as 24–20 winners at Suncorp Stadium. As Pangai Junior showed himself as the standout forward for Brisbane, he was under consideration for the New South Wales State of Origin squad, but he opted to stay loyal to Tonga to represent his family but later didn’t take part in the Pacific international against Samoa due to injury. After missing a couple of matches due to injury in Round 19 against the Penrith Panthers, Pangai Junior had a sensational first half, scoring two tries as Brisbane went on to win convincingly 50-18 at Suncorp Stadium. Pangai Junior would finish his best season to date, playing in 22 matches and scoring five tries for Brisbane. On 20 October, he played in the historical first-ever Test match between Tonga and the Australian Kangaroos, scoring a try in the 34-16 loss at Mt Smart Stadium, playing in front of a sold-out crowd at Mount Smart Stadium, Auckland. In late November, Pangai Junior announced that he wanted to represent New South Wales for the 2019 series, after being named in Brad Fittler’s 32-man training squad. On 6 December 2018, Pangai Junior re-signed with the Broncos on a 1-year contract for the 2019 season, despite being offered lucrative contracts from other clubs.

2019
Pangai Junior made 18 appearances for Brisbane as the club finished in eighth place and qualified for the finals.  He missed out on playing in Brisbane's 58-0 elimination final loss against Parramatta at the Western Sydney Stadium.

2020
On 12 August, Pangai Junior was stood down indefinitely by the NRL and fined $30,000 for "multiple breaches" of the league's COVID-19 regulations.

Statement issued by The Broncos Leagues Club 31 August 2020 in part states; {41} The Board has made a decision to terminate Mr Pangai Junior's employment immediately but any implementation of that decision has been suspended for a period of 12 months subject to Mr Pangai Junior complying with his employment agreement and complying with the following terms:

 He was stood down immediately without pay for the remainder of the 2020 season and as a consequence will be removed from the Project Apollo “bubble”
 He immediately began a mentoring program with a club-approved mentor for a period of 12 months, with the mentor reporting back to the Board on a monthly basis
 He worked in a job organised by that mentor for the remainder of the 2020 season
 He ceased to participate in social media, as well as ceasing to engage with media unless authorised by the Club
 He returns to full duties for the 2021 pre-season in mid-November this year in good physical condition
 If Mr Pangai Junior breaches any part of his employment agreement or these terms during the 12-month period during which the termination is suspended, then the Club can immediately implement its decision to terminate his employment
 If at the end of that 12 month period Mr Pangai Junior has complied with all the above requirements then the Board will rescind its decision to terminate his employment

Pangai Junior was limited to only nine games in the 2020 NRL season as Brisbane finished last on the table and claimed the wooden spoon for the first time in their history.

2021
Following Brisbane's 46-0 loss against South Sydney in round 15 of the competition, he was informed by Brisbane management that his services would not be required for the following season and he had permission to negotiate with other clubs.

On 21 July, Pangai Junior signed a three-month deal with Penrith after being released immediately by the Brisbane club for the rest of the 2021 NRL season.  On the same day, Pangai Junior signed a three-year deal to join the Canterbury-Bankstown Bulldogs ahead of the 2022 season.  Pangai Junior made his club debut for Penrith against South Sydney in round 23, coming off the interchange bench in a 25-12 victory.

Pangai Junior scored his first try for Penrith in round 24 of the competition in a 30-16 victory over the Wests Tigers.
Pangai Junior made a total of six appearances for Penrith in the 2021 NRL season, he played in the clubs preliminary final victory over Melbourne however he was not picked for the 2021 NRL Grand Final team which defeated South Sydney.

2022
In round 2 of the 2022 NRL season, Pangai Junior made his debut for Canterbury in their 16-10 loss against Brisbane at Stadium Australia.
Pangai Junior played 19 games for Canterbury throughout the year as the club finished 12th on the table and missed the finals.

References
41 .  Statement by Broncos Rugby League             Club 31 August 2020

External links

Canterbury Bulldogs profile
Penrith Panthers profile
Brisbane Broncos profile
NRL profile
2017 RLWC profile

1996 births
Living people
Australian people of Niuean descent
Australian people of Tuvaluan descent
Australian sportspeople of Tongan descent
Australian people of I-Kiribati descent
Australian rugby league players
Brisbane Broncos players
Junior Kangaroos players
Mount Pritchard Mounties players
Tevita
Penrith Panthers players
Canterbury-Bankstown Bulldogs players
Rugby league locks
Rugby league players from Sydney
Rugby league props
Rugby league second-rows
South Newcastle Lions players
Souths Logan Magpies players
Tonga national rugby league team players